Reggie Arnold (born March 30, 1987) is an American football running back who played for the Arkansas State Red Wolves football team.

While at Arkansas state, Arnold had three 1,000-yard rushing seasons. He accomplished the feat in 2006 (1,076 yards), 2007 (1,060 yards), and 2008 (1,074 yards). He ranks second in Arkansas State school history with a career total of 3,933 rushing yards. He was also a first-team pick on the FWAA's 2006 Freshman All-America team, and a Doak Walker Award candidate in 2007, 2008 and 2009.

High school career

References

1987 births
Living people
Sportspeople from Little Rock, Arkansas
American football running backs
Arkansas State Red Wolves football players